Janet Kidder (born 1972) is a Canadian actress known for her role of Osyraa in Star Trek: Discovery.

Biography
Janet Kidder is the daughter of John Kidder and the niece of actress Margot Kidder.

Career
Janet and Margot Kidder both appeared in "Walk on By", an episode of La Femme Nikita, as the younger and older Roberta, Nikita's mother. Janet's participation was in brief flashback sequences. She plays the character Lila Jacobs in the series Man in the High Castle and Osyraa in Star Trek: Discovery.

Filmography

Film

Television

External links
 

1972 births
20th-century Canadian actresses
21st-century Canadian actresses
Actresses from British Columbia
Canadian film actresses
Canadian stage actresses
Canadian television actresses
Living people
People from Cranbrook, British Columbia